Decinea percosius, the double-dotted skipper, is a species of butterfly of the family Hesperiidae. It is found from Belize north to Mexico. It is an occasional colonist up to the lower Rio Grande Valley in Texas, US.

Adults are on wing from March to November in southern Texas and Mexico.

The larvae feed on various grasses. Adults feed on flower nectar.

External links
Butterflies and Moths of North America

Hesperiini
Butterflies of North America
Butterflies described in 1900
Taxa named by Frederick DuCane Godman